Dark World is the debut release from Ann Arbor, Michigan based indie rock band Pity Sex released in March 2012.

Track listing

Personnel
Pity Sex
 Sean St. Charles - drums
 Brennan Greaves - guitar/vocals
 Britty Drake - guitar/vocals
 Brandan Pierce - bass

References

2012 debut EPs
Pity Sex albums